Marcus Vinícius Vidal Cunha (born 28 May 1992), commonly known as Marquinhos Carioca or simply Marquinhos, is a Brazilian professional footballer who plays as a winger.

Career
In February 2013 Marquinhos Carioca moved together with fellow Brazilian player João Felipe Antunes to Liga I side Oțelul Galați on a four-year contract. On 16 July 2014, Marquinhos moved to the Azerbaijan Premier League with Gabala FK, signing a two-year contract. Following a change of manager half-way through the 2014–15 season, Marquinhos Carioca had his contract terminated by mutual consent in January 2015, and went on to sign for Uruguayan Primera División side Club Atlético River Plate later the same year. In the 2018 season was a player of FK Žalgiris Vilnius. After one season he left the team.

Career statistics

Club

Other includes Brazilian state competitions and national super cups.

Honours
Žalgiris Vilnius
Lithuanian Cup: 2018

References

External links

Otelul Galati Info profile
Marquinhos Carioca at playmakerstats.com (English version of ogol.com.br)

Living people
1992 births
Footballers from Rio de Janeiro (city)
Brazilian footballers
Association football midfielders
Campeonato Brasileiro Série B players
Campeonato Brasileiro Série D players
Paraná Clube players
J. Malucelli Futebol players
Toledo Esporte Clube players
Liga I players
ASC Oțelul Galați players
FC Astra Giurgiu players
Azerbaijan Premier League players
Gabala FC players
Uruguayan Primera División players
Club Atlético River Plate (Montevideo) players
A Lyga players
FK Žalgiris players
Liga 1 (Indonesia) players
Badak Lampung F.C. players
Persela Lamongan players
Brazilian expatriate footballers
Brazilian expatriate sportspeople in Romania
Expatriate footballers in Romania
Brazilian expatriate sportspeople in Azerbaijan
Expatriate footballers in Azerbaijan
Brazilian expatriate sportspeople in Uruguay
Expatriate footballers in Uruguay
Brazilian expatriate sportspeople in Lithuania
Expatriate footballers in Lithuania
Brazilian expatriate sportspeople in Indonesia
Expatriate footballers in Indonesia